James Daly (1838, in County Mayo, Ireland – 21 January 1911, at his residence on Spencer St., Castlebar, County Mayo) was an Irish nationalist activist best known for his work in support of tenant farmers' rights and the formation of the Irish National Land League.

Beginnings
Daly was a conservative Catholic man from a comfortably-off Mayo farming family. He served from 1869 on the Castlebar Board of Guardians and as a guardian for the Litterbrick Division in Ballina union.

Daly took up the emerging political cause in the West to establish tenant farmers' rights against largely absentee landlords and participated in the meeting in Louisburgh, County Mayo in 1875, convened to establish a local tenants defence association.

From May 1876, Daly and Alfred O'Hea supported Matt Harris's Ballinasloe Tenants Defence Association.

In February 1876, together with Alfred O'Hea, he purchased the Mayo Telegraph, renamed The Connaught Telegraph in 1878, and became sole owner in 1879 on O'Hea's death. The Connaught Telegraph became the early publicity vehicle for what was initially a Mayo-based land movement.

On 26 October 1878, the Mayo Tenants' Defence Association (or Mayo Farmers' Club) was formed at Castlebar, with Westport barrister J. J. Louden as chairman and Daly as secretary. The local MP, John O'Connor Power, attended, giving the support of the "advanced" faction of the home rule movement to the growing land movement. This support was reinforced by Parnell himself when he joined Daly, O'Connor Power, James Kilmartin and Matt Harris at the Ballinasloe Tenants' Defence Association meeting on 3 November 1878.

The "Canon Bourke" controversy
The immediate trigger for the 20 April 1879 Irishtown mass meeting is disputed. According to one commonly quoted theory, in January 1879 local Irishtown tenant farmers asked Daly to take up their cause against a landowner variously referred to as 'Canon Ulick Burke' or Bourke, or 'Canon Burke' or 'Father Burke', who had inherited a property with 22 tenants, all in arrears, had increased rents and had taken legal steps to evict them. Burke is then said to have backed down after the mass meeting and decreased rents.

The historian T. W. Moody disputes this theory, claiming that this view is based on Michael Davitt's faulty recollection before the 1889 Times-Parnell Commission and his 1904 The Fall of Feudalism in Ireland, repeated by Sheehy-Skeffington in 1908; and that no contemporary accounts of the events mention a Canon Bourke as an issue. Moody claims that, in fact, Geoffrey James Bourke, the canon of Tuam Cathedral had nothing to do with the 'Bourke Estate', and that the tenants' dispute, if indeed there was one, would have been with the absentee landlord, his nephew Joseph Bourke; that Daly himself denounced the whole story and Davitt for his 'crass ignorance' of Mayo affairs and in fact the rents on the Bourke estate had been fixed in 1855 for 31 years and hence there could not have been any rack-renting; that Canon Bourke in fact supported the land movement and was on the platform and seconded John Dillon's resolution at the July 1879 Claremorris meeting; and remained to his death a much respected parish priest.

Moody presents Canon (alternatively he calls him Fr) Ulick Joseph Bourke, president of St Jarlath's College, Tuam, as a separate person who in fact was "far from unsympathetic to the fenians" and served on the committee of the Irish National Land League from its formation in October 1879. John Cunningham refers to 'Professor Ulick Bourke' as 'President of St Jarlath's', and quotes the fenian activist Mark Ryan's description of how Professor Bourke actively supported the 1868 election campaign of George Moore, a 'fenian sympathiser' and tenant right supporter.

Lead up to the 20 April 1879, Irishtown meeting
For many months the agriculture sector had been in recession due to bad harvests and cheap imports. The law as it stood was considered by many to unfairly favour landowners over struggling tenant farmers, leading to landowners evicting "unprofitable" tenant farmers and turning the land over to grazing. The traditionally somewhat conservative tenant farmers were becoming desperate for relief and willing to listen to aggressive nationalists who linked economic with political oppression in their messages and raised the question of who morally owned the land.

For Daly, by 1879 the time for action was right. He was expressing impatience in the Connaught Telegraph with achieving anything for the tenants, either through constitutional means or John Devoy's 'New Departure' (an 'unholy alliance' between pragmatic Fenians prepared to delay their resort to force, and radical Home Rulers). Delay could mean desperate men resorting to another failed uprising which he abhorred. Parnell was positioning himself to take over the Home Rule League after Isaac Butt died, and a growing land campaign would give him an issue for the coming election. Daly was not a Fenian but was prepared to accept any meaningful assistance short of violence from them. The current climate of the New Departure offered a perhaps short-lived opportunity to combine Fenian mass mobilisation and muscle, with activism within the constitutional system provided by Parnell and O'Connor Power, with Michael Davitt the key man in both camps.

Davitt was in Mayo at the time investigating land issues, assisted by and briefed by his cousin John Walshe. He is generally credited with having the vision to extend the scope of tenant land protests from the local to a coordinated national context. Davitt and a group of Fenians including John Walshe and P.W. Nally of Balla met with Daly and his local organizers, Fenian tenant farmers James Daly and Daniel O'Connor of Irishtown, and schoolteacher J.P. Quinn and two shopkeepers from Claremorris, Thomas Sweeney and John O'Kane.

A group of farmers from the Irishtown area had approached Daly in January 1879 during the Claremorris quarter-sessions about their treatment by landlords. To avoid libel, Daly refused to explicitly expose the landlords concerned but agreed to publish rent grievances in general. Daly publicised the grievances and advertised a mass protest meeting on 22 February 1879 in the Connaught Telegraph. The meeting had to be postponed until April. The day before the meeting, on Saturday 19 April 1879, Daly's announcement in the Connaught Telegraph read :-
IRISHTOWN TENANT-RIGHT MEETING

On to-morrow (Sunday) a mass meeting of the tenant farmers of Mayo, Galway, and Roscommon will be held at Irishtown, a few miles outside Claremorris, for the purpose of representing to the world the many and trying ordeals and grievances the tenant farmers labour under. There will be several leading gentlemen present who will speak on the occasion, amongst whom will be John O'C. Power, Esq., M.P., John Ferguson, Esq. Glasgow, and J.J.Louden, Esq. Westport. The meeting, it is considered, will be one of the largest ever held in Connaught.

The 20 April 1879, Irishtown meeting
The Connaught Telegraphs report of the meeting in its edition of 26 April 1879 began:-
Since the days of O'Connell a larger public demonstration has not been witnessed than that of Sunday last. About 1 o'clock the monster procession started from Claremorris, headed by several thousand men on foot – the men of each district wearing a laural leaf or green ribbon in hat or coat to distinguish the several contingents. At 11 o'clock a monster contingent of tenant-farmers on horseback drew up in front of Hughes's hotel, showing discipline and order that a cavalry regiment might feel proud of. They were led on in sections, each having a marshal who kept his troops well in hand. Messrs. P.W. Nally, J.W. Nally, H. French, and M. Griffin, wearing green and gold sashes, led on their different sections, who rode two deep, occupying, at least, over an Irish mile of the road. Next followed a train of carriages, brakes, cares, etc. led on by Mr. Martin Hughes, the spirited hotel proprietor, driving a pair of rare black ponies to a phæton, taking Messrs. J.J. Louden and J. Daly. Next came Messrs. O'Connor Power, J. Ferguson, and Thomas Brennan in a covered carriage, followed by at least 500 vehicles from the neighbouring towns. On passing through Ballindine the sight was truly imposing, the endless train directing its course to Irishtown – a neat little hamlet on the boundaries of Mayo, Roscommon, and Galway.

"Advanced" land-reformer and Home-Ruler John Ferguson's resolution stated the goal of the Land War:
That as the land of Ireland, like that of every other country, was intended by a just and all-providing God for the use and sustenance of those of his people to whom he gave inclination and energies to cultivate and improve it, any system which sanctions its monopoly by a privileged class, or assigns its ownership and control to a landlord caste, to be used as an instrument of usurious or political self-seeking, demands from every aggrieved Irishman an undying hostility, being flagrantly opposed to the first principle of their humanity – self-preservation.

Michael M. O'Sullivan, teacher at a Catholic College and early tenant right
activist from Galway, is said to have drawn the greatest audience response :-
. . . the past two seasons have been very bad, and disease in sheep has crept in to accumulate the distresses of the farmer. Under such circumstances does any man for a moment consider that the tenant farmers of Ireland can afford to pay the present exorbitant rents for their lands, or that the lands are worth those rents?
(Cheers, and cries of "They are not".)
It follows, then, that the present rents being too high, justice demands their reduction.
(cheers)
But, judging from the past, we know that, unfortunately, there are landlords. in Ireland who do not look to what is just, but to what the law will permit.
(hear, hear)
If, then, the landlords who are now demanding exorbitant rents
do not lower them to meet the requirements of the times and the altered
circumstances of the tenant farmers, let the tenant farmers themselves meet
together, and consult together, and settle among themselves what would be fair, equitable rent, and if that is not accepted by the landlord – why, let them pay none at all.
(great cheering, and loud cries of "None at all.")
A Voice – Let them do that (great cheering)
Mr. O'Sullivan – Let it not be considered that in councelling [sic] this I am acting thoughtlessly, unwisely, or impracticably.
(no, no)
I have given this question a great deal of thought. I have seen the Land Question in parliament brought forward with unanswerable eloquence, but with what result?
(Cheers, and a voice, "It was kicked out.")
What, then, are the people to do?
A Voice – Pay no rent at all.(cheers)
Mr. O'Sullivan – They cannot pay unreasonable rents, they wish to pay what is fair and just and it must be accepted. If not let the landlords who refuse take the consequences of refusal on their own heads.
(cheers)
It is...fearful to contemplate those consequences in their fullness ...extermination of the people on the one hand, and – we cannot shut our eyes to the lessons of the past – extermination of the exterminators on the other.
(applause)
"Ribbon Fenian" Thomas Brennan gave the following ominous address :
. . . I have read some history, and I find that several countries have from time to time been afflicted with the same land disease as that under which Ireland is now labouring, and although the political doctors applied many remedies, the one that proved effectual was the tearing out, root and branch, of the class that caused the disease. All right-thinking men would deplore the necessity of having recourse in this country to scenes such as have been enacted in other lands, although I for one will not hold up my hands in holy horror at a movement that gave liberty not only to France but to Europe. If excesses were at that time committed, they must be measured by the depth of slavery and ignorance in which the people had been kept, and I trust Irish landlords will in time recognise the fact that it is better for them at least to have this land question settled after the manner of a Stein or a Hardenberg than wait for the excesses of a Marat or a Robespierre.

T. M. Healy's view of the Irishtown meeting
T. M. Healy, eventually a bitter opponent of Parnell, presents a view of the Irishtown meeting in which Parnell had not yet seen the potential of a Land War, and also highlights the importance of the coverage provided by The Connaught Telegraph, one of only two newspapers (The Tuam Herald was the other) which covered the event:
No reporters attended the meeting. Power called on me when he returned to London to give an account of it. From what he said I realised that a new portent had arisen out of a leaden sky. He related that footmen in legions and horsemen in squadrons gathered round him to demand reductions of rent. The horsemen, he declared, were organised like cavalry regiments. The police were powerless, and Power foreshadowed that Ireland was on the verge of a movement which would end a dismal chapter. Yet his meeting was unnoted, save by a local weekly, the Castlebar Telegraph, owned by James Daly.

King-Harman, M.P. (afterwards Parliamentary Under-Secretary for Ireland), who read that paper, came upbraidingly to Power in the House of Commons. He and his class watched the trend of politics as stockbrokers do the money markets, for £ s.d. to them was the kernel of the Land question.
When Parnell heard of the success of the Irishtown meeting, he asked Davitt (who had been told to "boycott" it) to get up a second gathering there the following Sunday. At the second demonstration fresh speeches were made which attracted universal attention.

Davitt afterward explained that he would have attended Power's meeting only that he "missed the train." He was a lofty and generous character, yet James Daly, who helped at both gatherings, coined the jibe that Davitt would be "father of the Land League if he had not missed the train." Power refused to come to the second meeting, but the fire they kindled spread into a blaze which inflamed all Ireland.
T. W. Moody points out that Healy's comment about Davitt missing the train appears to come from A. M. Sullivan's 'New Ireland', p 434 and is otherwise uncorroborated; likewise his quoting of Daly's quip about Davitt is otherwise uncorroborated. However, it does appear that Daly and Davitt held differing views of their relative importance to the early land war. Moody points out that Daly's January 1881 account of the Irishtown meeting in the Connaught Telegraph claiming that Davitt was not involved until the June Westport meeting is untrue; similarly Davitt's July 1882 account left Daly out and claimed he himself was solely responsible, yet he told the 1889 Times-Parnell Commission that he (Davitt) was not responsible; then in his 1904 'Fall of Feudalism', when he was free to reveal all, he failed to give Daly any due.

Following the Irishtown meeting
Daly was chairman of the Westport meeting on 8 June 1879, addressed by Parnell and Davitt which finally gave national political impetus to the Land Reform movement.

Daly became vice-president of the new National Land League of Mayo on 16 August 1879, and was elected to the committee of the Irish National Land League founded in Dublin on 21 October 1879, when the Mayo Land League was absorbed into it.

The Bessborough Commission
"James Daly organised the presentation of Mayo evidence which strongly influenced the Bessborough Commission to recommend radical revision of the tenurial system, and thus provided Gladstone with immediate justification for the 1881 Land Act. In only thirty percent of cases did landlords challenge Daly's masterly command of his material concerning exorbitant rents, in less than ten percent did they seriously shake his evidence."

The "Gurteen three"
On 2 November 1879, Davitt addressed a land meeting at Gurteen, County Sligo, declaring of landlord-tenant relations : "the time has come when the manhood of Ireland will spring to its feet and say it will tolerate this system no longer".  Daly stated that "if anyone was evicted it was the duty of his fellows to assemble in their thousands and reinstate him the next day." James Bryce Killen ended his speech by wishing that "everyone at the meeting were armed with a rifle". On 19 November Davitt, Daly and Killen were arrested on a charge of using seditious language. Their arrest led to mass protest meetings, Parnell used it to launch a propaganda drive in Britain and the United States, and the authorities failed to achieve a conviction. Moody states that 'The government had thus incurred a great deal of ridicule'.

Davitt, Daly and Killen became known as 'The Gurteen Three'. President Mary McAleese has spoken thus of the incident :
The newspapers of the day throughout the western world were full of the trial of Davitt and his two colleagues for an allegedly inflammatory speech he had given at Gurteen, Co. Sligo. They were known as "The Gurteen Three" and the collapse of their trial spelt the end of feudal landlordism in Ireland.

Later years
Daly was not comfortable with the centralised control of the land movement and what he perceived as a drift away from the West, the real area of need, and also was concerned about use of physical force in pursuit of its aims. He returned to local politics and left the Land League. He sold the Connaught Telegraph to T.H. Gillespie in 1888 and became a full time farmer. He continued in local Government and served on Mayo County Council and Castlebar Urban District Council. Remaining a force in local politics, he supported the United Irish League and was President of the Connacht '98 Council.

Retrospective
Gerry Adams used the occasion of his Michael Davitt Centenary Lecture, 15 June 2006, to claim that land reform in the west of Ireland has since regressed.

Notes

References
Anne Kane. Constructing Irish National Identity: Discourse and Ritual during the Land War 1879–1882. Palgrave Macmillan, New York, 2012. 
Gerard Moran, "James Daly and the rise and fall of the Land League in the west of Ireland, 1879–82" in Irish Historical Studies, 29''' (1994), pages 189–207. 
The Forgotten Man of Irish History. http://www.mayo-ireland.ie/Mayo/News/ConnTel/CTHistry/JDaly.htm
Jane Stanford. That Irishman: The Life and Times of John O'Connor Power. The History Press, Ireland, May 2011. 

External links

Fr Kevin Hegarty, James Daly in The Mayo News'', 26 September 2007

1838 births
1911 deaths
Irish land reform activists
Irish Nationalist politicians